This is a list of films produced by the Dhallywood film industry of Dhaka, Bangladesh, ordered by year of release. Dhallywood films are generally listed under the Bengali language. Some films before 1971 were mixed Urdu and Bengali language.

1948–1969 
This is a list of notable films produced in East Pakistan (now Bangladesh) both in Bengali and Urdu languages. A total of 214 films were made since 1948–1971 in Dhaka. Among them 158 films were Bengali and 57 Urdu.

1970s

1970s
 List of Bangladeshi films of 1970
 List of Bangladeshi films of 1971
 List of Bangladeshi films of 1972
 List of Bangladeshi films of 1973
 List of Bangladeshi films of 1974
 List of Bangladeshi films of 1975
 List of Bangladeshi films of 1976
 List of Bangladeshi films of 1977
 List of Bangladeshi films of 1978
 List of Bangladeshi films of 1979

1980s 
 List of Bangladeshi films of 1980
 List of Bangladeshi films of 1981
 List of Bangladeshi films of 1982
 List of Bangladeshi films of 1983
 List of Bangladeshi films of 1984
 List of Bangladeshi films of 1985
 List of Bangladeshi films of 1986
 List of Bangladeshi films of 1987
 List of Bangladeshi films of 1988
 List of Bangladeshi films of 1989

1990s 
 List of Bangladeshi films of 1990
 List of Bangladeshi films of 1991
 List of Bangladeshi films of 1992
 List of Bangladeshi films of 1993
 List of Bangladeshi films of 1994
 List of Bangladeshi films of 1995
 List of Bangladeshi films of 1996
 List of Bangladeshi films of 1997
 List of Bangladeshi films of 1998
 List of Bangladeshi films of 1999

2000s 
 List of Bangladeshi films of 2000
 List of Bangladeshi films of 2001
 List of Bangladeshi films of 2002
 List of Bangladeshi films of 2003
 List of Bangladeshi films of 2004
 List of Bangladeshi films of 2005
 List of Bangladeshi films of 2006
 List of Bangladeshi films of 2007
 List of Bangladeshi films of 2008
 List of Bangladeshi films of 2009

2010s 
 List of Bangladeshi films of 2010
 List of Bangladeshi films of 2011
 List of Bangladeshi films of 2012
 List of Bangladeshi films of 2013
 List of Bangladeshi films of 2014
 List of Bangladeshi films of 2015
 List of Bangladeshi films of 2016
 List of Bangladeshi films of 2017
 List of Bangladeshi films of 2018
 List of Bangladeshi films of 2019

2020s 
 List of Bangladeshi films of 2020
 List of Bangladeshi films of 2021
 List of Bangladeshi films of 2022
 List of Bangladeshi films of 2023

References

External links 
 Bangladeshi film at the Internet Movie Database